Catherine Martin (born 26 January 1965) is an Australian costume designer, production designer and set designer. She won two Academy Awards for Moulin Rouge! in 2002 and another two for The Great Gatsby in 2014. Having won four Oscars, she is the most awarded Australian in Oscar history. She is credited for her several works alongside husband, filmmaker Baz Luhrmann, including Romeo + Juliet (1996), Moulin Rouge! (2001), Australia (2008), The Great Gatsby (2013), and Elvis (2022).

Life and career
Martin was born in Lindfield, New South Wales, to a French mother and an Australian father, both academics who met at the Sorbonne. She has one brother. As a child, Martin was fascinated by the vintage clothing parades occasionally thrown by her Australian grandmother and her church friends. She would beg her parents to take her to the Victoria and Albert Museum so she could dig through the costume section. Her mother taught her to use a sewing machine at age 6, and by age 15 she was creating her own patterns in order to make herself dresses. In an interview with Tory Burch, Martin mentioned The Wizard of Oz and Gone with the Wind as her childhood inspirations for her love of film and design.

She attended North Sydney Girls High School. As a student, she worked as an usherette at the Roseville theatre. She went on to study visual arts at the Sydney College of the Arts, pattern cutting at East Sydney Technical College, and design at the National Institute of Dramatic Art (NIDA), where she gained a Diploma in Design and started collaborating with fellow student and now husband Baz Luhrmann.

Martin designed sets and costumes for Luhrmann's one-act stage precursor of Strictly Ballroom. After completing studies, she worked as a designer on Luhrmann's production of "Lake Lost" (1988). In 1989, she designed the sets for an Australian stage adaption of Nikolai Gogol's story "Diary of a Madman", starring Geoffrey Rush. She worked on Luhrmann's La bohème (1990) and A Midsummer Night's Dream.

She recreated her designs for screen-version of Strictly Ballroom (1992), for which she won two Australian Film Institute Awards (Best Production design and Best Costume design). She won an Oscar nomination (as a production designer) for Luhrmann's  Romeo + Juliet (1996). She also made her debut as an associate producer for the same film. She married Luhrmann on her 32nd birthday, 26 January 1997.

Their third feature collaboration was Moulin Rouge! (2001), the last in Luhrmann's The Red Curtain Trilogy. She designed the sets and co-designed the costumes with Angus Strathie. The feature earned her two Academy Awards: for Best Art Direction and Best Costume Design, an award shared with Strathie for the latter.

In 2002, she adapted her set and costume designs for Luhrmann's Broadway adaptation of La bohème, for which she won Broadway's 2003 Tony Award for Best Scenic Design of a Musical and won a nomination as Best Costume Designer (along with Angus Strathie).

She designed Nicole Kidman's vintage wardrobe for her husband's 2008 film Australia. She has stated that the tailoring on the clothing produced for the film is one of her proudest achievements. In 2009, she received a fourth Oscar nomination for Best Achievement in Costume Design for Australia, but lost the award to Michael O'Connor for The Duchess.

The Great Gatsby
After her husband's insistence that she revisit The Great Gatsby, which she had not read since adolescence, the two began working on the novel's cinematic reinvention. The conceptualization for the film began 10 years prior to its release. Three years before it made its debut, Martin and Luhrmann began the initial design project for the film. The two consulted academic texts about the novel, as well as historical analyses pertaining to both Fitzgerald himself, as well as his work. They visited libraries at the Metropolitan Museum of Art and the Fashion Institute of Technology to further their research. Martin described herself during this time as being "like a detective". Luhrmann stated that since the book took place in 1922, was published in 1925, but foreshadowed the economic crash of 1929, anything within that decade was available to borrow for design purposes. This allowed Martin more room to play with trends and flattering pieces, such as her choice to dress lead actor Leonardo DiCaprio in slimmer-cut suits than what would have been typical in the beginning of the decade. For the women's clothes in the film, she erred towards the end of the decade, wanting to focus on slimmer silhouettes. She also took artistic liberties when it came to the actresses' shoes, telling Vogue that she found heels from the era to be "stumpy". She rationalised her choice to her usually anachronistically aware-self to use thinner-heeled shoes by telling herself she was copying what was found in fashion illustrations from the time. Martin was charged with creating 500 outfits for the film's various cast members. Martin worked with Brooks Brothers and Miuccia Prada, a longtime friend of her husband's, to design the costumes for the film. Prada designed twenty of the dresses for the film's first party scene, and an additional twenty for a second party scene. Tiffany & Co. supplied the film's jewelry.

For The Great Gatsby sets, Martin took inspiration from 1920s designer Syrie Maugham, as well as from houses on the Long Island Shore, where part of the film takes place. In total, 42 sets were constructed under Martin's vision in 14 weeks. She and Luhrmann aimed to make the film feel authentic, but also connective for a modern audience. For her work on the film, Martin earned the 2013 Academy Award for Best Costume Design, as well as the Academy Award for Best Production Design, the latter which she shares with Beverley Dunn. These two wins resulted in Martin becoming the Australian with the most Academy Awards.

Shortly after the release of Gatsby, Martin collaborated with Brooks Brothers to release a limited edition menswear collection. She has also launched a range of home wares, featuring paints, wallpaper and rugs.

Awards and honours
In 2013, Martin was a Glamour Magazine Woman of the Year. Discussing her and Luhrmann's progression as artists, Marin told the magazine, "We've gone from me staying up all night to paint the floor to where I am now, with 300 carpenters working for me. I feel like the ". For her spread in their December issue, her husband photographed her alongside their children.

Martin's work was featured in fellow costume designer Deborah Nadoolman Landis' 2013 book Hollywood Costume.

She has stated that she is no longer tempted to keep any wardrobe mementos from the films she works on, telling Fashionista, "... I realised through long and hard experience the best record of your work, is the work itself."

Martin has stated that she prides herself on ensuring the costumes she produces are beautifully made, comfortable, and easy to take on and off.

In 2016, Martin and Luhrmann developed the Netflix television series The Get Down, which takes place in 1970s South Bronx. Martin was an executive producer of the series.

In 2022, she was the recipient of the Longford Lyell Award at the AACTA Awards, a lifetime achievement award which is the highest accolade awarded by the Australian Academy of Cinema and Television Arts.

Personal life
She met her husband, Baz Luhrmann, in college and the pair wed in 1997. The couple has two children together: a girl, Lillian Amanda Luhrmann, born on 10 October 2003 and a boy, William Alexander Luhrmann, who was born on 8 June 2005. In July 2015, the couple placed their Darlinghurst, Sydney, home on the market for $16 million AUD, in favour of establishing a more settled family life in New York City, where their family has been spending more and more time.

Filmography

Film

Television

Awards and nominations

Honours
 1999: Honoured by the Australian Film Institute with the Byron Kennedy Award.
 2022: Honoured by the Australian Academy of Cinema and Television Arts with the Longford Lyell Award.

Accolades
Academy Awards

British Academy Film Awards

Tony Awards

Other Awards

References

External links
 catherinemartin.com
 
 Catherine Martin Rugs

1965 births
Living people
Australian art directors
Australian costume designers
Australian film producers
Australian people of French descent
Australian production designers
Australian scenic designers
Australian women film producers
Best Art Direction Academy Award winners
Best Costume Design Academy Award winners
Best Costume Design BAFTA Award winners
Best Production Design AACTA Award winners
Best Production Design BAFTA Award winners
Drama Desk Award winners
People educated at North Sydney Girls High School
People from Sydney
Tony Award winners
Women costume designers
Women production designers